Under Western Stars is a 1938 American Western film directed by Joseph Kane and starring Roy Rogers, Smiley Burnette, Carol Hughes, and the Maple City Four. Written by Dorrell McGowan, Stuart E. McGowan, and Betty Burbridge, the film is about a populist singing cowboy who decides to run for Congress in order to seek federal assistance to help small ranchers regain their water rights during the Dust Bowl of the 1930s. His campaign comes into conflict with greedy water company executives.

The film was the first starring role for Rogers, made under contract to Republic Pictures during a walkout by the studio's singing cowboy Gene Autry. The picture was filmed on location in the Alabama Hills of Lone Pine, California. The film's song "Dust", written by Johnny Marvin, was nominated for an Academy Award for Best Song. In 2009, Under Western Stars was selected for the National Film Registry by the Library of Congress for being "culturally, historically or aesthetically" significant and will be preserved for all time.

Plot
John Fairbanks' water company refuses to allow free water for the farmers and ranchers. When Roy Rogers and his men overpower the dam's guards and release the valve on the water, a sympathetic judge fines Roy one dollar and convinces him to follow in his father's footsteps and run for the United States House of Representatives. Roy wins the election and fights his best to have the Federal Government step in to solve the dire situation. Roy is encouraged and secretly helped by John Fairbanks feisty daughter, Eleanor.

Cast
 Roy Rogers as Roy Rogers
 Smiley Burnette as Frog
 Carol Hughes as Eleanor Fairbanks
 Maple City Four as Singers
 Guy Usher as John Fairbanks
 Tom Chatterton as Congressman Edward H. Marlowe
 Kenneth Harlan as Richards
 Alden Chase as Tom Andrews
 Brandon Beach as Senator Wilson
 Earl Dwire as Mayor Biggs
 Jean Fowler as Mrs. Wilson
 Dora Clement as Mrs. Marlow
 Dick Elliott as William P. Scully
 Burr Caruth as Larkin
 Slim Whitaker as Tremaine
 Jack Rockwell as Sheriff
 Frankie Marvin as Deputy Pete

References

External links
Under Western Stars essay  by Howard Kazanjian and Chris Enss at National Film Registry

 
 
 
 
 Under Western Stars essay by Daniel Eagan In America's Film Legacy, 2009-2010: A Viewer's Guide To The 50 Landmark Movies Added To The National Film Registry In 2009-10, Bloomsbury Publishing USA, 2011,  pages 60–63 

1938 Western (genre) films
1938 films
American Western (genre) films
Films shot in Lone Pine, California
Republic Pictures films
United States National Film Registry films
American black-and-white films
Films produced by Sol C. Siegel
1930s political comedy-drama films
American political comedy-drama films
Films about politicians
Films directed by Joseph Kane
1930s English-language films
1930s American films